Củ Chi Base Camp (also known as Củ Chi Army Airfield) is a former U.S. Army and Army of the Republic of Vietnam (ARVN) base in the Củ Chi District northwest of Saigon in southern Vietnam.

History

1965-70
Củ Chi Base Camp was established in 1965 near Highway 1, 25 km northwest of Tan Son Nhut Air Base and 50 km southeast of Tây Ninh. The camp was located south of the Vietcong stronghold known as the Iron Triangle and was near and in some cases above the Cu Chi Tunnels.

The 25th Infantry Division had its headquarters at Củ Chi from January 1966 until February 1970.

Other units stationed at Củ Chi included:
1st Battalion, 8th Artillery (1966-1971)
7th Battalion, 11th Artillery (1966–70)
1st Battalion, 27th Artillery (February-December1970)
2nd Battalion, 32nd Artillery (November 1965-April 1967, October 1969-January 1972)
6th Battalion, 77th Artillery (May 1967 – 1968)
1st Battalion, 321st Artillery (November 1967-February 1968)
1st Brigade, 1st Cavalry Division(January 1969)
2nd Brigade, 1st Infantry Division (September 1969) comprising:
2nd Battalion, 16th Infantry
1st Battalion, 18th Infantry
2nd Battalion, 18th Infantry
2nd Brigade, 101st Airborne Division (February–October 1968) comprising:
1st Battalion, 501st Infantry
2nd Battalion, 501st Infantry
1st Battalion, 502nd Infantry
3rd Brigade, 101st Airborne Division (July–September 1968) comprising:
1st Battalion, 502nd Infantry
1st Battalion, 506th Infantry
2nd Battalion, 506th Infantry
588th Engineer Battalion (July 1966-April 1967, May–November 1970)
7th Surgical Hospital (June 1966-April 1967)
12th Evacuation Hospital (September 1966-December 1970)
269th Aviation Battalion ( January 1967-April 1971) comprising:
116th Assault Helicopter Company (September 1966-June 1970)
188th Assault Helicopter Company 
242nd Assault Support Helicopter Company (November 1967-April 1971)

From 1967 the 159th Medical Detachment (Helicopter Ambulance) with Bell UH-1D Hueys was deployed here.

The airfield was capable of accommodating de Havilland Canada C-7 Caribou and Fairchild C-123 Provider aircraft.

On 3 January 1969 a Vietcong bomb exploded in a messhall at the camp killing 15 Americans mostly from the 554th Engineer Battalion and two Vietnamese kitchen staff.

On 26 February 1969 PAVN sappers attacked the base destroying 9 Boeing CH-47A Chinook helicopters of the 242nd ASH Company.

1970-75
Following the departure of the U.S. forces in 1972, Củ Chi became the base of the ARVN 25th Division.

Current use
The base remains in use by the People's Army of Vietnam. The airfield is no longer used but is still visible on satellite images.

References

Installations of the United States Army in South Vietnam
Military installations of South Vietnam
Buildings and structures in Ho Chi Minh City